Violeta Ivanova Zareva (born 29 May 1968) is a Bulgarian rower. She competed at the 1988 Summer Olympics and the 1992 Summer Olympics.

References

1968 births
Living people
Bulgarian female rowers
Olympic rowers of Bulgaria
Rowers at the 1988 Summer Olympics
Rowers at the 1992 Summer Olympics
Rowers from Sofia